Neale Woods is a nature preserve nearly 600 acres in size in North Omaha, Nebraska. Located about 10 miles north of Downtown, Neale Woods is located in the Ponca Hills on top of the Missouri River Valley. It is operated by  Fontenelle Forest.

History 
Neale Woods was begun with a donation of 120 acres of land by Edith Neale in 1971.  Neale's father had homesteaded the land in the mid-1800s. An additional 60 acres of contiguous land was given by Carl Jonas, whose father had been one of the founding members of Fontenelle Forest.  After his death, a bequest from Jonas' estate made possible the purchase of 112 acres of additional land.  Of that amount, 25 acres were cleared and designated as prairies, planted in a way thought to be representative of the land in the mid-1800s.  Jonas' former home now serves as the Neale Woods Nature Center.

Facilities 

The Neale Woods Nature Center provides trail maps for visitors. A printable trail map is also available online in digital PDF format. Trails are open every day from dawn until dusk.  The nature center building is open to visitors seasonally during the spring/summer/fall.

Astronomy 
Neale Woods was home to the Millard Observatory, which was the largest public observatory in the Omaha metropolitan area. Astronomy nights were generally held two times per month, between the months of August and May.

Featured telescopes included:
10” Schmidt-Cassegrain
2 - 12” Meade LX 200 GPS
14” Celestron
13” Coulter
8” Meade
3 - 6” telescopes

The Observatory closed in 2013  and the equipment moved to the Strategic Air Command & Aerospace Museum.

See also 
Fontenelle Forest
Trails in Omaha
Tourism in Omaha, Nebraska

References

External links
 Fontenelle Forest Visitor Information
 Neale Woods - reviewed by Omaha.net
 Audubon Nebraska - Audubon Nebraska

1971 establishments in Nebraska
Geography of Omaha, Nebraska
Protected areas established in 1971
Protected areas of Douglas County, Nebraska
Nature centers in Nebraska
Tourist attractions in Omaha, Nebraska